Playtime (Sprachkurs) is a German television series.

See also
List of German television series

1980s German television series
English-language education television programming